Sabri Dino (1 January 1942 – 14 January 1990) was a Turkish professional footballer. During his career, he prominently played for Beşiktaş J.K. and he also represented Turkey at international level. Spent 11 seasons at Beşiktaş until his retirement, Sabri Dino was a decorated player, winning titles of 1. Lig twice, Turkish Cup and President Cup once.

Career

Club career
Sabri Dino started his career at age of 14 at Tarabya S.K. in Tarabya, Istanbul. After Tarabyaspor, he had respective spells Galatasaray youth division and Denizgücü Spor Kulübü where he rose to fame before he enrolled for mandatory duty at Army. Fulfilled his duty, he joined Beyoğlu S.K. at 1963–64 season.

Following the departure of Özcan Arkoç to FK Austria Wien in 1964, Beşiktaş signed Dino following a transfer contention with Fenerbahçe. Initially, becoming a rotational keeper behind the first choice keeper Necmi Mutlu, Dino became a regular keeper by 1967–68 season.

On 13 August 1980, arbitrated by World Cup referee Doğan Babacan, Dino's testimonial was held between Beşiktaş and Galatasaray in which he was replaced by Mete Bozkurt on 10th minute where game ended 1–1, eventually.

International career
Represented Turkey  total of 19 times at different age categories, Dino capped for Turkey 12 times at senior level between 1969 and 1975.

Style of play
Dino is described as a "modern goalkeeper" with skills of aerial ability, positioning and anticipation.

Personal life

Sabri Dino is nephew of renowned Turkish painter Abidin Dino. He attended Deutsche Schule Istanbul in Beyoğlu for high school education.

Following his retirement, he entered in textile business in men's clothing. However, his business suffered exchange rate fluctuations and he eventually bankrupted. Following reported economical challenges, Sabri Dino committed suicide at Beylerbeyi abutment of Boğaziçi Bridge on 14 January 1990, Sunday. He was married with Meral Dino, with two sons, Murat and Cem.

Dino was also a member of Executive Committee of Turkish Football Federation in 1986, during presidency Erdenay Oflaz.

Turkish author Sunay Akın dedicated his 2018-released goalkeepers-related book Kalede 1 Başına to Sabri Dino.

Honours

Club
Beşiktaş
 1. Lig (2): 1965–66, 1966–67
 Turkish Cup (1):  1974–75
 President Cup (1):
 TSYD Cup (2): 1966, 1972

International
Turkey
 RCD Cup (2): 1969, 1974

Individual
Beşiktaş J.K. Squads of Century (Golden Team)

References
Citations

Bibliography
Books

External links
 Profile at TFF
 Profile at Beşiktaş J.K. official website. 

1942 births
1990 suicides
Footballers from Istanbul
Association football goalkeepers
Beşiktaş J.K. footballers
Turkey international footballers
Suicides by jumping in Turkey
Turkish footballers